Juan Gutiérrez (1578 – 20 March 1649) was a Catholic prelate who served as Bishop of Vigevano (1646–1649).

Biography
Juan Gutiérrez was born in Cordoba, Spain.
On 25 June 1646, Juan Gutiérrez was selected as Bishop of Vigevano and confirmed by Pope Innocent X on 18 May 1648. 
On 1 June 1648, he was consecrated bishop by Alfonso de la Cueva-Benavides y Mendoza-Carrillo, Cardinal-Bishop of Palestrina, with Giovanni Battista Scanaroli, Titular Bishop of Sidon, and Stefano Martini, Bishop of Noli, serving as co-consecrators. 
He served as Bishop of Vigevano until his death on 20 March 1649.

References

External links and additional sources
 (for Chronology of Bishops) 
 (for Chronology of Bishops) 

17th-century Italian Roman Catholic bishops
1578 births
1649 deaths
Bishops appointed by Pope Innocent X